Alan Dowson (born 17 June 1970) is an English football manager and former professional player who manages Dartford.

He made 55 appearances in the Football League between 1988 and 1993, before spending 13 years as a player in non-league football. He later managed a number of non-league football teams.

Playing career
Dowson began his playing career with Millwall, progressing through the youth ranks before signing a professional contract with the first time in May 1988. Making a single appearance for the Lions, he also played for Fulham on a one-month loan in January 1990.

After his release from Millwall, Dowson was quickly snapped up by Bradford City, where he made 18 appearances in a single season. A year with Darlington saw the defender become a regular in the first team before dropping into non-league football.

Joining Slough Town ahead of the 1993–94 season, Dowson featured 43 times throughout the campaign joining Gateshead, he then spent two years with Gateshead before over a decade at Walton & Hersham. On 20 December 1996, Dowson signed for the Surrey club - who had recently been relegated to the Isthmian League Division One.

Dowson announced his retirement from playing at the end of the 2005–06 season.

Managing career 
After eight years with Walton & Hersham in a playing capacity, the club announced Dowson was to feature as player-manager in October 2004. Finishing as runners-up in his debut managerial campaign, Dowson also guided the club to the fourth round of the FA Trophy while recording a record-breaking 13-match winning run in all competitions.

Dowson announced his resignation from the Swans in January 2007, shortly before joining Kingstonian. In his second full season as manager, he saw his side crowned champions of the Isthmian Division One South and promoted to the Premier Division. The K's finished fifth upon their return to the seventh tier in the 2009–10 season, but missed out on back-to-back promotions, losing in the play-off final to Boreham Wood.

In his final season as manager of Kingstonian, Dowson recorded his best league finish of second - following two seasons in a mid-table position. However, they failed to gain promotion once again after defeat in the play-offs semi-final. He announced his resignation at the end of the season to spend some time away from football and focus on his family.

On 14 September 2014, Dowson was unveiled as manager at Hampton & Richmond Borough. Joined by his familiar backroom staff, including Premier League commentator Martin Tyler, Dowson guided the Isthmian Premier Division side to a 12th-placed finish in his inaugural season. After a lacklustre 2014-15 campaign saw the Beavers finish 15th, Dowson led Hampton to become champions during the 2015–16 season, losing just seven league fixtures while scoring 105 goals.

He was appointed Woking manager in May 2018. In his first season in charge Dowson took Woking to a 2nd-placed finish, gaining promotion to the National League with a 1–0 win against Welling United in the playoff-final. The club also enjoyed its most successful FA Cup run in almost two decades, defeating Swindon Town to earn a famous home tie with Premier League club Watford in the Third Round of the FA Cup. Woking, the only Level 6 side left in the competition, lost the match 2–0. On 28 February 2022, Dowson was sacked by the club following a "prolonged run of poor form in the league", ending his four-year association with the Surrey-based side.

In May 2022 he became manager of Dartford. Dowson oversaw an impressive start to the season that saw him awarded the National League South Manager of the Month award for October 2022.

Career statistics

Manager

References

1970 births
Living people
English footballers
Association football fullbacks
Millwall F.C. players
Fulham F.C. players
Bradford City A.F.C. players
Darlington F.C. players
Slough Town F.C. players
Gateshead F.C. players
Walton & Hersham F.C. players
English Football League players
English football managers
Hampton & Richmond Borough F.C. managers
Woking F.C. managers
National League (English football) managers
Dartford F.C. managers